Mykhaylo Ryashko (born 5 November 1996 in Mukacheve, Zakarpattia Oblast, Ukraine) is a Ukrainian football midfielder who plays for Kecskeméti.

Career
Ryashko spent some years in the Sportive Youth systems in Dynamo Kyiv, UFC-Karpaty and FC Mukacheve. He made his debut in the Ukrainian Premier League for club FC Hoverla Uzhhorod in a match against FC Dnipro Dnipropetrovsk entraining in the second half-time on 19 July 2015.

Personal life
He is the son of Ukrainian football manager Viktor Ryashko and younger brother of the Ukrainian footballer of the same name, Viktor Ryashko Jr.

References

External links 
 
 

Ukrainian footballers
Ukrainian expatriate footballers
Association football defenders
1996 births
Living people
People from Mukachevo
FC Karpaty Mukacheve players
FC Dynamo Kyiv players
FC Hoverla Uzhhorod players
Balmazújvárosi FC players
Kisvárda FC players
FC Mariupol players
FC Illichivets-2 Mariupol players
Dorogi FC footballers
Kecskeméti TE players
Ukrainian Premier League players
Ukrainian Second League players
Nemzeti Bajnokság II players
Expatriate footballers in Hungary
Ukrainian expatriate sportspeople in Hungary